James Dempsey, known online as Flushy, is an English professional poker player from Brighton, England, who won a World Series of Poker bracelet at the 2010 World Series of Poker in the $1,500 Pot Limit Hold'em event and a World Poker Tour title at the 2011 Doyle Brunson World Poker Classic.

Dempsey's other activities include playing recreational golf and semi-professional bocce

World Series of Poker 
At the 2010 World Series of Poker (WSOP), after winning his first bracelet in the 1,500 Pot Limit Hold'em event and earning $197,470, he made a smaller cash of $10,497 coming 69th in the $5,000 No Limit Hold'em event but then at the $10,000 Omaha Hi-Low Split-8 or Better Championship, he finished runner-up to Sammy Farha, while earning his biggest cash to date of $301,789.
At the 2013 World Series of Poker Europe (WSOPE), he had two cashes.

World Series of Poker bracelets

World Poker Tour 

In December 2011, Dempsey won the Doyle Brunson World Poker Classic, beating a field of 413 players and a final table that included Antonio Esfandiari (6th place), Vanessa Selbst (3rd place), and Soi Nguyen (2nd place.) Dempsey earned $821,612 for his win.

As of 2019, his total live tournament winnings exceed $2,100,000.

Notes

Living people
World Series of Poker bracelet winners
English poker players
Year of birth missing (living people)